Razor USA LLC, better known as Razor, is an American designer and manufacturer of manual and electric scooters, bicycles, and personal transporters. The company was founded in Cerritos, California in 2000 by Carlton Calvin and the JD Corporation. Razor also owns the RipStik, Sole Skate, and Pocket Pros brands.

Products

Kick scooters

The first Razor scooter was manufactured by JD, and distributed by The Sharper Image. Since JD founded RazorUSA, JD also began to sell scooters under the JDBUG brand.

 10th anniversary - reproduced first Razor scooter
 A
 A2
 A3
 A5 Lux
 B - Discontinued 
 Cruiser
 Folding Kiddie Kick
 Graffiti
 Hello Kitty
 Lil' Kick

 Pro Model
 Spark
 Spark DLX
 Sweet Pea A
 Sweet pops
 Ultra Pro
 Wild Style
 RZ Ultralite - never officially released
 Razor Pro Model DLX
 Razor Ultra Pro Model
 Razor Pro X
 Razor Pro XX
 Razor Pro XXX
 Razor Phase Two - Jason Beggs Signature Model
 Razor Phase Two - John Radtke Signature Model

Electric scooters

 E90
 Power Core 90
 E100
 E100 Glow
 Sweet Pea E100
 E125
 E150
 E175
 E200
 E200S
 E225
 E275
 E300
 E300S
 Sweet Pea E300S
 E325
 eSpark
 EcoSmart Metro

Electric ride ons
ATV
 Dirt Quad - children's electric four-wheeler with pneumatic knobby tires
Go-carts
 Dune Buggy
 Ground Force
 Ground Force Drifter
 Ground Force Drifter Fury
Motorcycles
 MX350 Dirt Rocket
 MX400 McGrath
 MX500 Dirt Rocket
 MX650 Dirt Rocket
Motorscooters
 Pocket Mod
Self-balancing hoverboards
Hovertrax
Hovertrax DLX
Crazy Carts
Crazy Cart
Crazy Cart XL

Caster driven scooter
Caster driven scooters are a modern form of three-wheeler popular during the 1970s and 80s.

Bicycles
Razor branded bicycles are provided by Kent under license. All the following are Freestyle bikes except as noted.
	
 12" Rumble 
 16" DSX 16 - Dual suspension MTB
 MicroForce 	
 18" Kobra - Freestyle 	
 18" XR09 - Freestyle  	
 20" Tempest - Freestyle frame 	
 20" Rage - Freestyle frame 	
 20" Aggressor - Freestyle frame 	
 20" Hydro - BMX hydroformed lightweight aluminum frame 	
 20" Two-Zero 	
 20" Nebula  	
 20" FS-2000 	
 20" Razor Crossfire

Other products
Razor branded skateboards, pads, and helmets are provided by Kent under license.

References

External links
 

Razor Online Store in UAE
Razor Online Store in Qatar

Vehicle manufacturing companies established in 2000
2000 establishments in California
Kick scooters
Cerritos, California
Human-powered vehicles
Cycle manufacturers of the United States
Companies based in Los Angeles County, California
Manufacturing companies based in Greater Los Angeles